The Beverly Handicap was an American Thoroughbred horse race first run in 1938 at Washington Park Race Track in the Chicago metropolitan area and moved to Arlington Park in 1962.  A race for fillies and mares age three and older, the Beverly Handicap was run on dirt until 1965 when it was changed to a race on turf.

The race was run in two divisions in 1966.

In 1954, Hall of Fame jockey Johnny Adams won the Beverly Handicap on his fortieth birthday. Riding Good Call, he edged out  runnerup Vixenfixit, ridden by his son, Ralph Adams.

In 1959, Honey's Gem won the Beverly, setting an American record of 1:34.00 for a mile on dirt. Her record was equaled by the 1961 winner, Equifun.

Winners

References

Discontinued horse races
Horse races in Illinois
Washington Park Race Track
Arlington Park
Recurring sporting events established in 1938
Recurring sporting events disestablished in 1970
1938 establishments in Illinois
1970 disestablishments in Illinois